Claudiney Batista dos Santos (born 13 November 1978) is a Paralympian athlete from Brazil competing in category F57/T57 throwing events. He won a silver medal in the javelin throw at the 2012 Paralympics and a gold medal in the discus throw at the 2016 Rio Games.

Career history
Batista was born able bodied, but after a road accident in May 2005 part of his left leg needed to be amputated. While in hospital he was visited by para-athletic organisations offering sport as a way to help in his recovery. He refused to accept their invitation for over two years, before changing his mind. In 2011 he was part of the Brazilian team which entered into the 2011 Parapan American Games. He entered the javelin and discus, both in the joint F57/58 class, winning the javelin and coming third in the discus. He followed this by being selected for the 2012 Summer Paralympics in London, entering all three throwing events in the F57/58 class. In the discus, he threw a distance of 45.90m, which did not convert to enough points to see him onto the podium, finishing instead at fourth place. In the shot put he finished seventh. His strongest event, the javelin, saw him record a distance of 45.38m, a new world record, only to see his rival, Iran's Mohammad Khalvandi, also throw a world record as a F58 athlete to snatch the gold from Batista dos Santos by 20 points.

At the 2013 IPC Athletics World Championships in Lyon, France, Batista dos Santos was again on the podium. He came third in the discus, taking bronze, and second in the javelin beaten again by Mohammad Khalvandi.

He was one of the 54 paralympians cleared to compete at the Tokyo Olympics postponed to 2021. Other athletes included Rayane Soares (T13, low vision), Beth Gomes (F52), Jerusa Geber Dos Santos (T11), Cícero Valdiran (F57) and Thiago Paulino.

References

External links

 

1978 births
Living people
Paralympic athletes of Brazil
Brazilian male discus throwers
Brazilian male shot putters
Brazilian male javelin throwers
Paralympic gold medalists for Brazil
Paralympic silver medalists for Brazil
World record holders in Paralympic athletics
Medalists at the 2012 Summer Paralympics
Medalists at the 2016 Summer Paralympics
Medalists at the 2020 Summer Paralympics
Athletes (track and field) at the 2012 Summer Paralympics
Athletes (track and field) at the 2016 Summer Paralympics
Athletes (track and field) at the 2020 Summer Paralympics
Paralympic medalists in athletics (track and field)
Medalists at the 2011 Parapan American Games
Medalists at the 2015 Parapan American Games
Medalists at the 2019 Parapan American Games
21st-century Brazilian people